Sekolah Berasrama Penuh Integrasi Gombak (abbreviated INTEGOMB) is one of the 67 boarding schools administered by the Sektor Sekolah Berasrama Penuh (a sector under the Ministry of Education Malaysia). Located in Sungai Pusu, Gombak, the school is a few kilometres from the International Islamic University Malaysia (IIUM).  This school is known as InteGomb as an abbreviation from its name among SBPs. Sekolah Berasrama Penuh Integrasi Gombak have shown outstanding achievements both academically and in co-curriculum activities. Sekolah Berasrama Penuh Integrasi Gombak have been ranked top 10 among other elite fully residential schools since 2008 in the Sijil Pelajaran Malaysia. In the  Sijil Pelajaran Malaysia 2013 examination, the school gained GPS of 1.18 (20 students obtaining straight A's )to become the best school in Selangor.
The school made a history in the SPM 2020 examination to become the best school in Malaysia with GPS of 1.00

History 
The concept of Sekolah Berasrama Penuh Integrasi or Integrated Fully Residential School was proposed in 2002 by Tan Sri Musa Mohamad, the then Minister of Education. This type of school provides three academic streams for its students; Islamic science, science and technical. At that time, students who wanted to pursue their studies in the Islam science stream needed to attend religious schools.

Sekolah Berasrama Penuh Integrasi Gombak started its operation in December 2002. The first group of students registered on 17 February 2003. During that time, there were only 14 teaching staff that catered for 162 students in form 4 and form 1. After 4 years of its establishment, in 2007, the school has 601 students and 65 teaching staff, including 30 Thailand students after 3 years later.

Sekolah Berasrama Penuh Integrasi Gombak has been recognised as a high-performance school (Sekolah Berprestasi Tinggi) in the early of the year 2011. As of 2014, Sekolah Berasrama Penuh Integrasi Gombak have been nominated as one of the few schools that was awarded "School of Global Excellence" making it one of the youngest school aside the others.

Administration 
The school is led by a head teacher appointed by the Ministry of Education, Malaysia, assisted by three senior assistants (penolong kanan in Malay); senior assistant (Administration), senior assistant (Students' affairs) and senior assistant (Co-curricular activities). The posts are held by:
 Principal:Tuan Haji Ahmad Shafrin Bin Abdul Aziz

Past principals include:

 Puan Hajah Aminah Aboo Bakar (2002-2006)
 Puan Hajah Norlia Mohd Shuhaili, A.M.P (2007-2009)
 Puan Hajah Sharifah Asmak Syed Alwee (2009-2010)
 Tuan Haji Jamaluddin Yusoff (2010)
 Puan Wan Saberina Binti Wan Musa (2011-2013)
 Puan Rahanim Binti Abdul Rahim (2014-2016)
 Encik Salleh Bin Ismail (2016-2017)
 Puan Nor Hayati Binti Yusoff (2017-2021)
 Puan Wan Suryani Binti Wan Mohd Razali (2021-2022)
 Tuan Haji Ahmad Shafrin Bin Abdul Aziz (2022-today)

Infrastructure 

The school caters for a maximum of 800 students by providing hostels and classrooms.

Education system 
The school provides education for students from form 1 to form 5.  Form 1 and form 4 students are selected by the Sektor Sekolah Berasrama Penuh to enrol in the school. Students with excellent Ujian Penilaian Sekolah Rendah (UPSR) results and Pentaksiran Tingkatan Tiga (PT3) will be shortlisted to be offered to study in the school.

The school prepares students to face two major public examinations which are the Pentaksiran Tingkatan Tiga (PT3), where form 3 students need to take and the Sijil Pelajaran Malaysia (SPM), where form 5 students need to take upon completion of their secondary education.

Alumni
Azzim Zahid Azmi - Bulan Bintang apparel founder.
Teme Abdullah - architect, author and artist.

See also 
 List of schools in Selangor

References

External links
 

2002 establishments in Malaysia
Educational institutions established in 2002
Co-educational boarding schools
Islamic schools in Malaysia
Schools in Selangor